Ilya Seryi (born 18 April 1985, in Chernihiv) is a defender.

Honours
Desna Chernihiv
 Ukrainian Second League: 2012–13

References

External links
 Profile on Official website of Ukrainian Second League
 Illia Siryi soccerway.com

1995 births
Living people
Piddubny Olympic College alumni
Footballers from Chernihiv
Ukrainian footballers
Association football defenders
FC Yunist Chernihiv players
FC Chernihiv players
FC Desna Chernihiv players
FC Avanhard Koriukivka players
FC Yednist Plysky players
FC Stroitel Pripyat players
Ukrainian Second League players